Michal Matloch (born 5 August 1985 in Třinec) is a Czech figure skater. He is the 2004–2005 Czech national silver medalist. His highest placement at an ISU Championship was 29th at the 2005 European Figure Skating Championships.

Results

External links
 

1985 births
Czech male single skaters
Sportspeople from Třinec
Living people